Eurobounds is the second home video released by the Japanese heavy metal band Loudness. It was released on BETA, VHS, Laserdisc and VHD formats in 1984. This release documented the first European tour of the band, with footage from concerts in England, Holland, Belgium and West Germany. Columbia Records remastered the video and re-released it in DVD format in 2000. A live album with the sound track of the DVD was also released in 2000, with the same cover art of the DVD.

CD track listing
All tracks by Minoru Niihara & Akira Takasaki

"Crazy Doctor" – 4:17
"Lonely Player" – 5:02
"Milky Way" – 4:20
"Dream Fantasy" – 4:43
"In The Mirror" – 3:49
"Esper" – 4:24
"Speed" – 7:28
"Loudness" – 4:31

Personnel 
Loudness
Minoru Niihara - vocals
Masayoshi Yamashita - bass
Munetaka Higuchi - drums
Akira Takasaki - guitars

References

2000 live albums
Loudness (band) live albums
2000 video albums
1984 video albums
Loudness (band) video albums
Live video albums
1984 live albums
Columbia Records live albums
Columbia Records video albums